The following outline is provided as an overview of and topical guide to Nepal:

Nepal is a landlocked sovereign state in South Asia. The country is bordered to the north by China, and to the south, east, and west by India. The Himalayas in the country's northern region has eight of the world's ten highest mountains, including Mount Everest, called Sagarmatha in Nepali.

General reference 

 Pronunciation:nɛpɑːl
 Common English country name: Nepal
 Official English country name:  The Federal Democratic Republic of Nepal
 Common endonym(s): List of countries and capitals in native languages
 Official endonym(s): List of official endonyms of present-day nations and states
 Adjectival(s): Nepali
 Demonym(s): Nepalese (also 'Nepali') 
 Etymology: Name of Nepal
 International rankings of Nepal
 ISO country codes:  NP, NPL, 524
 ISO region codes:  See ISO 3166-2:NP
 Internet country code top-level domain: .np

Geography of Nepal
 Nepal is: a landlocked country
 Location:
 Northern Hemisphere and Eastern Hemisphere
 Eurasia
 Asia
 South Asia
 Indian subcontinent
 Time zone: Nepal Time (UTC+05:45)
 Extreme points of Nepal
 High: Mount Everest  – highest point on Earth
 Land boundaries:  2,926 km
 1,690 km
 1,236 km
 Coastline:  none
 Nepal Geological Society
 Population of Nepal: 29,609,623(2019 estimate)  – 48th most populous country

 Area of Nepal: 147,516 km2
 Atlas of Nepal

Environment of Nepal 

Environment of Nepal
 Climate of Nepal
 Natural disasters in Nepal
 2007 South Asian floods
 April 2015 Nepal earthquake
 Environmental issues in Nepal
 Renewable energy in Nepal
 Geology of Nepal
 Protected areas of Nepal
National parks in Nepal
 Chitwan National Park
 Langtang National Park
 Bardia National Park
 Sagarmatha National Park
 Khaptad National Park
 Rara National Park
 Shey Phoksundo National Park
 Makalu Barun National Park
 Shivapuri Nagarjun National Park
 Banke National Park
Shuklaphanta National Park
Parsa National Park
 Wildlife reserves in Nepal
Koshi Tappu Wildlife Reserve
 Hunting reserves in Nepal
 Dhorpatan Hunting Reserve

Biota of Nepal
Wildlife of Nepal

Fauna of Nepal
 Birds of Nepal
 Asian openbill stork
 Barred buttonquail
 Black stork
 Black-crowned night heron
 Black-headed ibis
 Black-necked stork
 Cattle egret
 Cheer pheasant
 Chinese pond heron
 Great cormorant
 Great egret
 Great hornbill
 Greater adjutant
 Indian peafowl
 Indian pond heron
 Lesser whistling duck
 Little cormorant
 Oriental darter
 Painted stork
 Purple heron
 Sarus crane
 Scarlet minivet
 Spot-billed pelican
 Sultan tit
 Woolly-necked stork
 Spiny babbler
 Mammals of Nepal
 Bengal fox
 Clouded leopard
 Corsac fox
 Marbled cat
 Red panda
 Snow leopard
 Tibetan fox
 Reptiles of Nepal
 Trimeresurus septentrionalis
 Bengal monitor
 Indotestudo elongata
 Yellow monitor
 Cyrtodactylus nepalensis
 Gloydius himalayanus

Flora of Nepal
 Garden angelica
 Juglans regia (okhar/English walnut)
 Luculia gratissima
 Meconopsis villosa
 Persicaria affinis
 Rhododendron arboreum
 Ruellia capitata

Natural geographic features of Nepal 

Geography of Nepal
 List of World Heritage Sites in Nepal

Glaciers of Nepal
Glaciers of Nepal
 Hunku Glacier
 Khumbu Glacier
 Khumbu Icefall

Rivers of Nepal
structured list

Lakes of Nepal
 Begnas Lake
 Fewa Lake
 Gajedi Taal
 Gosaikunda
 Lausha Taal
 Rara Lake
 Khoshte Taal
 Phoksundo Lake
 Tilicho Lake
 Rupa Lake
 Jhilmili Tal
 Ghoda Ghodi Tal
 Rani Pokhari
Khaptad Lake

Mountains of Nepal
List of mountains in Nepal
Trekking peak
List of Ultras of the Himalayas
Himalayan sub-ranges
Far west
Changla Himal – transhimalayan range (on Nepal-Tibet Autonomous Region border)
Gurans Himal
Api (mountain)
Saipal
upper Karnali basin
Kanti Himal – transhimalayan border range
Kanjiroba Himal – south of Dolpa
Kagmara Lekh – south of Kanjiroba, north of Dhaulagiri
west of Kaligandaki River
Gautam Himal – transhimalayan border range
Mukut Himal – 6,000m and 5,000m peaks northeast of Dhaulagiri II
Dhaulagiri – DI-DVI, Tukucha, Churen, Putha Hiunchuli, Gurja, Ghustang, Sita Chuchura, Junction Pk., Myagdi Matha
Dwari Lekh – lower peaks at western end of Dhaulagiris
east of Kaligandaki
Damodar and Peri Himal – transhimalayan border range
Annapurna
Hiunchuli
Machapuchare
Nilgiri Himal
Singu Chuli
Tharpu Chuli
Tilicho Peak
North of Gorkha
Mansiri Himal
Himalchuli
Manaslu
Ngadi Chuli
Chamar
Ganesh Himal
Ganesh NW (Ganesh II/III)
Salasungo
Yangra
North of Kathmandu
Langtang Himal
Dorje Lakpa
Dragmarpo Ri
Langtang Lirung
Yala Peak
west of Arun River
Rolwaling Himal
Gauri Sankar
Melungtse
Mahalangur Himal
Ama Dablam
Baruntse
Chamlang
Cholatse
Cho Oyu
Cho Polu
Everest
Everest Base Camp
South Col
Lhotse
Nuptse
Gyachung Kang
Imja Tse
Kala Patthar
Kanguru
Khumbutse
Kongde Ri
Kusum Kangguru
Makalu
Mera Peak
Nirekha
Num Ri
Pokalde
Pumori
Taboche
Thamserku
east of Arun
Janak Himal
Kangchenjunga
Jannu
Mahabharat Range
Siwaliks
Dundwa Range

Provinces of Nepal 

Provinces of Nepal

Ecoregions of Nepal

Administrative divisions of Nepal 

Administrative divisions of Nepal
 Provinces of Nepal
 Districts of Nepal
 Municipalities of Nepal
 Gaupalikas of Nepal

Administrative divisions by province

Province No. 1 
Khotang District
Okhaldhunga District
Solukhumbu District
Udayapur District
Bhojpur District
Dhankuta District
Morang District
Sankhuwasabha District
Sunsari District
Terhathum District
Ilam District
Jhapa District
Panchthar District
Taplejung District

Province No. 2 
 Saptari District
Siraha District
Bara District
Parsa District
Rautahat District
Dhanusa District
Sarlahi District
Mahottari District

Bagmati Province 

 Bhaktapur District
Dhading District
Lalitpur District
Kathmandu District
Kavrepalanchok District
Nuwakot District
Rasuwa District
Sindhulpalchok District
Chitwan District
Makwanpur District
Dolakha District
Ramechhap District
Sindhuli District

Gandaki Province 

 Baglung District
Mustang District
Myagdi District
Parbat District
Gorkha District
Kaski District
Lamjung District
Manang District
Syangja District
Tanahu District
Nawalpur District

Lumbini Province 
Arghakhanchi District
Gulmi District
Kapilvastu District
Parasi District
Palpa District
Rupandehi District
Banke District
Bardiya District
Dang District
Pyuthan District
Rolpa District
Eastern Rukum District

Karnali Province 
 Salyan District
 Dolpa District
Humla District
Jumla District
Kalikot District
Mugu District
Dailekh District
Jajarkot District
Surkhet District
 Karnali Zone

Sudurpashchim Province  
Baitadi District
Dadeldhura District
Darchula District
Kanchanpur District
Achham District
Bajhang District
Bajura District
Doti District
Kailali District

Municipalities of Nepal 

Municipalities of Nepal
 Capital of Nepal: Kathmandu
 List of cities in Nepal

Gaupalikas of Nepal 
Gaupalikas of Nepal

Demography of Nepal 

Demographics of Nepal
 Ethnic groups of Nepal
 Religion in Nepal

Government and politics of Nepal 

Politics of Nepal
 Form of government: Secular federal parliamentary multi-party representative democratic republic
 Capital of Nepal: Kathmandu
 Elections in Nepal
 1959 | 1971 | 1981 | 1986 | 1991 | 1994 | 1999 | 2008 | 2013 | 2017
 Political parties in Nepal
 Nepal Communist Party
 Nepali Congress
People's Socialist Party, Nepal

Branches of the government of Nepal 

Government of Nepal

Executive branch of the government of Nepal 
 Head of state: President of Nepal
 Vice President of Nepal
 Head of government: Prime Minister of Nepal,
 List of prime ministers of Nepal
 Cabinet of Nepal
 MOPE

Legislative branch of the government of Nepal 
 Federal parliament of Nepal
 Rastriya Sabha (National Assembly) – upper house of the parliament
 Pratinidhi Sabha (House of Representatives) – lower house of the parliament

Judicial branch of the government of Nepal 
Judiciary of Nepal
 Supreme Court of Nepal
 High Courts of Nepal
 District Courts of Nepal

Foreign relations of Nepal 
Foreign relations of Nepal
 Diplomatic missions in Nepal
 Diplomatic missions of Nepal
 BIMSTEC
 Bhupalis
 Britain-India-Nepal Tripartite Agreement
 Foreign aid to Nepal
 Nepal Embassy, Riyadh
 Nepalese non-government organisations in Hong Kong

International organization membership 
The Federal Democratic Republic of Nepal is a member of:

African Union/United Nations Hybrid operation in Darfur (UNAMID)
Asian Development Bank (ADB)
Bay of Bengal Initiative for Multi-Sectoral Technical and Economic Cooperation (BIMSTEC)
Colombo Plan (CP)
Food and Agriculture Organization (FAO)
Group of 77 (G77)
International Bank for Reconstruction and Development (IBRD)
International Chamber of Commerce (ICC)
International Civil Aviation Organization (ICAO)
International Criminal Police Organization (Interpol)
International Development Association (IDA)
International Federation of Red Cross and Red Crescent Societies (IFRCS)
International Finance Corporation (IFC)
International Fund for Agricultural Development (IFAD)
International Labour Organization (ILO)
International Maritime Organization (IMO)
International Monetary Fund (IMF)
International Olympic Committee (IOC)
International Organization for Migration (IOM)
International Organization for Standardization (ISO) (correspondent)
International Red Cross and Red Crescent Movement (ICRM)
International Telecommunication Union (ITU)
International Telecommunications Satellite Organization (ITSO)
International Trade Union Confederation (ITUC)
Inter-Parliamentary Union (IPU)
Multilateral Investment Guarantee Agency (MIGA)
Nonaligned Movement (NAM)

Organisation for the Prohibition of Chemical Weapons (OPCW)
South Asia Co-operative Environment Programme (SACEP)
South Asian Association for Regional Cooperation (SAARC)
United Nations (UN)
United Nations Conference on Trade and Development (UNCTAD)
United Nations Educational, Scientific, and Cultural Organization (UNESCO)
United Nations Industrial Development Organization (UNIDO)
United Nations Integrated Mission in Timor-Leste (UNMIT)
United Nations Interim Force in Lebanon (UNIFIL)
United Nations Mission in Liberia (UNMIL)
United Nations Mission in the Central African Republic and Chad (MINURCAT)
United Nations Mission in the Sudan (UNMIS)
United Nations Observer Mission in Georgia (UNOMIG)
United Nations Operation in Cote d'Ivoire (UNOCI)
United Nations Organization Mission in the Democratic Republic of the Congo (MONUC)
United Nations Stabilization Mission in Haiti (MINUSTAH)
United Nations Truce Supervision Organization (UNTSO)
Universal Postal Union (UPU)
World Confederation of Labour (WCL)
World Customs Organization (WCO)
World Federation of Trade Unions (WFTU)
World Health Organization (WHO)
World Intellectual Property Organization (WIPO)
World Meteorological Organization (WMO)
World Tourism Organization (UNWTO)
World Trade Organization (WTO)

Law and order in Nepal 

Law of Nepal
 Capital punishment in Nepal
 Constitution of Nepal
 Crime in Nepal
 Human rights in Nepal
 LGBT rights in Nepal
 Freedom of religion in Nepal
 Law enforcement in Nepal
 Armed Police Force Nepal
 Nepalese Police Force
 Nepal citizenship law
 Sarbochha Adalat

Military of Nepal 

Military of Nepal
 Command
 Commander-in-chief: President of Nepal
 Ministry of Defence
 Forces
 Army of Nepal
 Nepalese Army Air Service
 Military history of Nepal
 Armed Police Force Nepal
 Gurkha
 Brigade of Gurkhas
 Britain-India-Nepal Tripartite Agreement
 Nepalese Police Force
 Military ranks of Nepal

Provincial government 
 Governor
 Chief Minister
 Pradesh Sabha
 Provincial governments of Nepal

Local government 

 Local government in Nepal
 Mayors in Nepal

History of Nepal 

History of Nepal
 Amshuverma
 Arimalla
 Bhrikuti
 Chabahil
 Congress Mukti Sena
 Darjeeling
 Five-year plans of Nepal
 Toni Hagen
 Garhwal
 Jana Aandolan
 Jang Bahadur
 Jayasthitimalla
 Kot massacre
 Kumaon
 Licchavi
 Mustang (kingdom)
 Nepal during World War I
 Nepalese Civil War
 Nepalese mohar
 Rana autocracy
 Rana dynasty
 Sonam Lhundrup
 Sugauli Treaty
 Sikkim
 Treaty of Titalia
 Unification of Nepal

History of Nepal, by period 

Timeline of Nepalese history
 Sino-Nepalese War
 Anglo-Nepalese War, aka Gurkha War (1814–1816)
 Nepalese–Tibetan War
 Nepal in World War II
 1950 Indo-Nepal Treaty of Peace and Friendship
 1990 People's Movement
 April 1992 general strike in Nepal
 2004 in Nepal
 2006 democracy movement in Nepal
 Nepalese Civil War

History of Nepal, by region

History of Nepal, by subject 
 Democracy movement in Nepal
 Military history of Nepal

Massacres in Nepal
 Kot massacre
 Nepalese royal massacre

Previous governments of Nepal 
 National Assembly of Nepal
 Nepal House of Representatives
 Parliament of Nepal

Nepalese monarchs
 Nepalese monarchy
 Birendra of Nepal
 Dipendra of Nepal
 Girvan Yuddha Bikram Shah Deva
 Gyanendra of Nepal
 Mahendra of Nepal
 Pratap Singh Shah
 Prithvi of Nepal
 Prithvi Narayan Shah
 Rana Bahadur Shah
 Surendra of Nepal
 Tribhuvan of Nepal
 Tribhuvan

Prime Ministers of Nepal
 List of prime ministers of Nepal
 Man Mohan Adhikari
 Bishweshwar Prasad Koirala
 Jang Bahadur
 Kirti Nidhi Bista
 Girija Prasad Koirala
 Krishna Prasad Bhattarai
 Lokendra Bahadur Chand
 Marich Man Singh Shrestha
 Mohan Shamsher Jang Bahadur Rana
 Sher Bahadur Deuba
 Surya Bahadur Thapa

Culture of Nepal 

Culture of Nepal
 Architecture of Nepal
 Bhimfedi
 Bhote Koshi Project
 Boudhanath
 Chabahil
 European Union Culture Centre Nepal
 Kopan Monastery
 Media in Nepal
 Museums in Nepal
 National Museum of Nepal
 Nepal Olympic Museum
 National symbols of Nepal
 Coat of arms of Nepal
 Flag of Nepal
 National anthem of Nepal
 Nepal Dalit Utthan Manch
 Nepalese sculpture
 Prostitution in Nepal
 Public holidays in Nepal
 Records of Nepal

Art in Nepal 
 Cinema of Nepal
Rajamati
 Chipa: Nipa:
 Silu (film)
 Literature of Nepal
Television in Nepal
 Theatre in Nepal
 Nepalese handicrafts

Music of Nepal 
Music of Nepal
 Music of Sikkim
 Narayan Gopal
 Nepali rock
 Newari Music

Nepalese musical instruments
 Damphu
 Dhime
 Dholak
 Jhyali
 Maadal
 Sarangi

Nepalese poets
 Abhi Subedi
 Bairagi Kainla
 Bhupi Sherchan
 Gopal Prasad Rimal
 Krishnabhooshan Bal
 Lakshmiprasad Devkota
 Suman Pokhrel
 Ishwar Ballav
 Hari Bhakta Katuwal

Nepalese musicians
 Ani Choying Dolma
 Jhalak Man Gandarbha

Nepalese flautists
 Manose Singh

Cuisine of Nepal 
Nepalese cuisine
 Dido and Gundruk
 Chiura
 Dal bhaat
 Oil cake
 Raksi

Newari cuisine 
 Newari Cuisine
 Ailaa
 Baji
 Chataamari
 Chwelaa
 Dhau
 Jaa
 Kachilaa
 Lakhamari
 Sanyaa
 Sanyaakhunya
 Thwon
 Yomari

Festivals of Nepal
 Buddha Jayanti (Baishak Purnima)
 Losar ( Gyalpo Lhosar, Sonam Lhosar, Tamu Lhosar)
 Dashain
 Jatra (Indra jatra-Yenya, Ghode jatra, Gai Jatra, Bisket Jatra)
 Maghe Sankranti
 Makar Sankranti
 Sa Paru
 Teej
 Tihar (festival)
 Uttarayana
 Holi

Languages of Nepal
 Nepali language
 Awadhi language
 Bhojpuri language
 Bahing language
 Kham language
 Limbu language
 Magar language
 Maithili language
 Mundari language
 Nepal Bhasa
 Tamang language
 Tharu languages
 Santali language
 Pali Bhasa

Organisations based in Nepal
 ICIMOD
 Nepal Mountaineering Association
 Nepal Scouts
 Nepal Olympic Committee
 All Nepal Football Association

Non-profit organizations based in Nepal
 Madan Puraskar Pustakalaya
 National Museum of Nepal
 Nepal Mathematical Society
 Nepal Physical Society
 Association for the protection of Children (APC-NEPAL)

Volunteer organizations in Nepal
 Association of Youth Organizations Nepal

People of Nepal 
People of Nepal

Ethnic groups in Nepal
 Badi People
 Bahing
 Chepang people
 Dhobi
 Ethnic groups of South Asia
 Gandarbha
 Gurung
 Hayu
 Jirel
 Kami (caste)
 Kham Magar
 Kirant
 Kiratas
 Kusunda
 Lepcha people
 Limbu people
 Magar people
 Newar
 Rai (ethnic group)
 Ranjitkar
 Sherpa people
 Tamang
 Thakali
 Thami
 Tharu people
 Yadav
 Yakkha
 Santal
 Shakya

Social groups of Nepal

Dalit
 Dalit Nationalism
 2006 Dalit protests in Maharashtra
 Adi Dravida
 Bahujan Samaj Party
 Bahujan Samaj Party (Nepal)
 Balmiki
 Bhangi
 Chamar
 Chandala
 Dalit
 Dalit Bahujan Shramik Union
 Dalit Buddhist movement
 Dalit Freedom Network
 Dhobi
 Domba
 Hari (outcaste)
 Holeya
 Kherlanji Massacre
 Kinnaraya
 List of Scheduled Tribes in India
 Madiga
 Mahar
 Mala (caste)
 Nalavar
 Paraiyar
 Pulayar
 Kanshi Ram
 Rodiya
 Sakkiliar
 Scheduled Caste and Scheduled Tribe (Prevention of Atrocities) Act, 1989
 Scheduled Castes and Tribes
 Shudra

Religion in Nepal 
Religion in Nepal – over 30% of the population follow Hinduism (see Hinduism in Nepal below).

Buddhism in Nepal 
Buddhism in Nepal

Kopan Monastery
 Lumbini

Buddhist temples in Nepal
 Boudhanath
 Swayambhunath
 Mayadevi Temple
 Kagyu Institute of Buddhist Studies – KIBS

Hinduism in Nepal 
Hinduism in Nepal

Hindu temples in Nepal
 Guhyeshwari Temple
 Pashupatinath temple
 Suryavinayak Temple
 Dakshinkali Temple
 Kamalvinayak Temple
 Mahankal Temple
 Gokarna Mahadev Temple
 Sankata Temple
Batuk Bhairav Temple
 Jalvinayak Temple
 Manakamana of Tumlingtar, at Tumlingtar
Bhadrakali Temple
Bhadrakali Temple, Pokhara
Tal Barahi
Bindhyabasini Temple
Akala Devi Temple, Pokhara
 Vimshenthan Temple
 Gorakhnath Temple
 Swargadwari
 Ramjanaki Temple(Janakpur)
Pindeshwor (Dharan)
Budhasubba (Dharan)
 Dantakali (Dharan)
 Supa Deurali (Arghakhanchi)
 Bageshowri Temple, Nepalgunj

Other religions in Nepal 
 Christianity in Nepal
 Protestants in Nepal
 Roman Catholicism in Nepal
 Islam in Nepal
 Judaism in Nepal
 Sikhism in Nepal

Other temples in Nepal
 Changu Narayan
Kumari
 Swayambhunath
 Pashupatinath
 Muktinath
 Guhyeshwari Temple
 Sobha Baghwati
 Swargadwari
 Kasthamandap
 Janaki Mandir
 Ankuri Mahadev
 Dakshinkali Temple
 Chandannath Mandir

Sports in Nepal 
Sports in Nepal
 Nepal at the Olympics
 Nepal at the Asian Games
 Football in Nepal
 Cricket in Nepal

Major Sports Leagues 
 Martyr's Memorial A-Division League (Football)
 Nepal National League (Football)
 Everest Premier League (Cricket)
 Dhangadhi Premier League (Cricket)
 Kwiks Basketball League (Basketball)

World Heritage Sites in Nepal
List of World Heritage Sites in Nepal
 Lumbini (Birth Place of Buddha) 
 Chitwan National Park
 Sagarmatha National Park
 Swoyambhunath
 Boudhanath
 Pashupatinath Temple
 Bhaktapur Durbar Square
 Kathmandu Durbar Square
 Patan Durbar Square
 Changu Narayan Temple
 Sagarmatha National Park

Economy and infrastructure of Nepal 

Economy of Nepal
 Economic rank, by nominal GDP (2007): 118th (one hundred and eighteenth)
 Agriculture in Nepal
 Nepalese cocoyam
 Nepalese sorghum
Currency of Nepal: Rupee
ISO 4217: NPR
 Nepalese banknotes
 Nepalese rupee
 Economic development in Nepal
 Bhote Koshi Project
 Five-year plans of Nepal
 Nepal Risk Reduction Consortium
 Energy in Nepal
 Energy policy of Nepal
 Oil industry in Nepal
 Foreign aid to Nepal
 Mining in Nepal
 Nepal Stock Exchange
 Tourism in Nepal
 Water supply and sanitation in Nepal
 Natural resources of Nepal
Mineral resources of Nepal

Banking in Nepal 
Banking in Nepal

 Laxmi Bank Limited
 Himalayan Bank Limited
 Nabil Bank
 Nepal Bank Limited
 Nepal Industrial and Commercial Bank
 Nepal Investment Bank Limited
 Nepal Rastra Bank
 Rastriya Banijya Bank
 Kumari Bank Limited
 Global Bank Limited
 Bank of Kathmandu Limited
 Nepal SBI Bank Limited
 DCBL Bank Limited
 Citizens Bank International Limited
 Prime Commercial Bank Limited
 KIST Bank Limited
 Standard Chartered Bank Nepal Limited
 Tourism Development Bank
 Machhapuchre Bank Limited
 Sanima Bank Limited
 Janta Bank Limited
 NIC Asia Bank
 Globle IME Bank

Communications in Nepal
Communications in Nepal

Telecommunications in Nepal

Telecommunications in Nepal
Ncell
Nepal Telecom
SmartCell
Hello Nepal

Nepalese media

Media of Nepal

Internet in Nepal 

Internet in Nepal
 .np
 Nepal Internet Exchange
 Network Service Providers in Nepal

Newspapers published in Nepal

 Himalayan Times
 Kantipur Publications
Republica
 Nepali Times
 Nepal Samacharpatra
 Nepal Traveller Publications

Radio in Nepal 

 List of FM Radio Stations in Nepal
 Radio Nepal
 Radio Kantipur
 Radio Upatyaka

Television in Nepal 

 Sagarmatha TV
 ABC
 Image Channel
 NTV 2 Metro
 Nepal Chautari
 Nepal Television
Kantipur Television
 Galaxy 4k TV
 Mountain Television
 Avenues

Online News Media in Nepal
 Online khabar
 Ratopati
 Setopati

Companies of Nepal

 Nepal Derivative Exchange Limited
 Laxmi Bank Limited
 Himalayan Bank Limited
 Nabil Bank
 Nepal Bank Limited
 Nepal Investment Bank Limited
 Nepal Rastra Bank
 Nepal Stock Exchange
 Nepal Telecom
 Rastriya Banijya Bank
 Yomari
 United Group (P) Ltd.
 COSELI
Nabil Investment Banking Ltd.
 Sanima Capital Ltd.

Trade unions of Nepal
 Trekking company in Nepal
All Nepal Trade Union Congress
 All Nepal Trade Union Federation (Revolutionary)
 Democratic Confederation of Nepalese Trade Unions
 General Federation of Nepalese Trade Unions
 Independent Transport Workers Association of Nepal
 Nepal Independent Hotel Workers Union
 Nepal Independent Workers Union
 Nepal Progressive Trade Union Federation
 Nepal Trade Union Congress
 Trekking Workers Association of Nepal

Transport in Nepal 

Transport in Nepal
 AH2
 Rail transport in Nepal

Aviation in Nepal
 Aeronautical Society of Nepal
 Airports in Nepal

Airlines of Nepal
 Buddha Air
 Flying Dragon Airlines
 Gorkha Airlines
 Nepal Airlines
 Shree Airlines
 Sita Air
 Yeti Airlines

Defunct airlines of Nepal
 Agni Air
 Air Ananya
 Air Nepal International
 Asian Airlines
 Base Air
 Cosmic Air
 Everest Air
 Karnali Air
 Impro Airways
 Mero Air
 Mountain Air (Nepal)
 Necon Air
 Shangri-La Air
 Skyline Airways

Aviation incidents in Nepal
 PIA Flight 268
 Thai Airways International Flight 311

Education in Nepal 

Education in Nepal
 Institute of Medicine, Nepal
 Ministry Of Education, Keshar Mahal, Kathmandu
 Institute of Engineering
 Nepalese Children's Education Fund
 Nepal Village Foundation

Schools in Nepal

List of schools in Nepal

Universities and colleges in Nepal

List of universities and colleges in Nepal 
 Kathmandu University
 Pokhara University
 Tribhuvan University
 Purbanchal University
 Mid West University
 Agriculture and Forestry University
 Nepal Sanskrit University

Health in Nepal 

Health in Nepal
 Health care in Nepal
 Institute of Medicine, Nepal
 Manipal Teaching Hospital
 Nepalese Journal of Ophthalmology

See also 

List of international rankings
Member state of the United Nations
Nepalese honey with tejpat oil
Outline of Asia
Outline of geography

References

External links 

 Government of Nepal
 
 Library of Congress — Nepal
 United States Department of State Profile of Nepal
 Nepal topics. The World Factbook. Central Intelligence Agency.
 National Geographic Country Profile: Nepal
 Languages of Nepal from the Ethnologue
 The Carter Center information on Nepal
 Nepal Travel Information

 Travel Nepal Information

Nepal